"Forever Loving You" is a song recorded by Canadian country music artist Julian Austin. It was released in 2000 as the third single from his second studio album, Back in Your Life. It peaked at number 5 on the RPM Country Tracks chart in August 2000.

Chart performance

References

2000 songs
2000 singles
Julian Austin (musician) songs
Songs written by Julian Austin (musician)
ViK. Recordings singles